Tsam-thuk is a type of Tibetan cuisine soup that uses yak or sheep soup stock and tsampa (roasted barley flour) as well as a variety of Tibetan cheeses. It can be served at room temperature.

See also

 List of soups
 List of Tibetan dishes

References

Tibetan cuisine